Cornelius Cruys (14 June 1655 – 14 June 1727) was a Norwegian–Dutch admiral of the Imperial Russian Navy, and the first commander of the Russian Baltic Fleet.

Early life and career 
He was born as Niels Olufsen in Stavanger, Norway, in 1655. His parents were Oluf Gudfastesen and Apelone Nielsdatter Koch. It is uncertain when Niels Olufsen emigrated to the Dutch Republic and changed his name to Cornelis Cruys ("Kornelius Krøys" or "Cornelis Cruijs"). However, according to several municipal sources, Cruys lived in Amsterdam for at least eighteen years before he joined the Russian Navy.

The first known record about Cruys was produced by the local administration of Amsterdam in 1681. That year he married the nineteen-year-old Catharina Voogt. She was born in Amsterdam and was the daughter of Claas Pieterszoon Voogt, a Dutch captain of a merchantman, and Jannetje Jans. In the civil registration of his marriage, Cruys was called a sailor from Amsterdam, 24 years old, an orphan. In December of that year, about seven months after his marriage, Cruys was officially registered as a citizen or poorter of Amsterdam.

In 1680 Cruys became the captain of a Dutch merchantman. Until 1696, he sailed to Portugal, Spain, and the Caribbean. In July 1696, he joined the Dutch Navy. He was appointed onder-equipagemeester at the naval dockyard of the Amsterdam Admiralty. In less than two years he would leave the United Provinces for the Russian Navy.

Service in Russia
In 1697, Russian Tsar Peter I travelled incognito with a large Russian delegation – the so-called Grand Embassy. He visited the Dutch Republic to study the latest inventions, especially in shipbuilding. Thanks to the mediation of Nicolaas Witsen, mayor of Amsterdam and expert on Russia par excellence, the tsar was given the opportunity to gain practical experience in the largest private shipyard in the world, belonging to the Dutch East India Company in Amsterdam, for a period of four months. The tsar helped with the construction of an East Indiaman,  the frigate Peter en Paul.

During his stay in the Dutch Republic, the tsar engaged, with the help of Russian and Dutch assistants, many skilled workers such as builders of locks, fortresses, shipwrights and seamen. They had to help him with his modernization of Russia. The best-known sailor who made the journey from the Netherlands to Russia was Cornelis Cruys. Cruys accepted the tsar's generous offer to enter into his service as vice-admiral. He emigrated to Russia in 1698 and became the tsar's most important adviser in maritime affairs.

Cruys performed well in Russia and came be regarded as the architect of the Russian Navy. After his return to Russia the Tsar put his Azov Flotilla under the command of Admiral Fyodor Alexeyevich Golovin, a Russian nobleman who was the successor of the Swiss Franz Lefort. Golovin was assisted by Vice-Admiral Cruys and Rear-Admiral Jan van Rees. Cruys became the first "Russian" mayor of Taganrog from 1698 to 1702.

In 1711, he made the first maps of Azov Sea and Don River. He was commander of the Russian Baltic Fleet from 1705, and masterminded the construction of Kronstadt fortress, which was essential in the Great Northern War against Sweden and many years later against the German Kriegsmarine during World War II. Cruys worked for the tsar for more than 25 years and reached the highest Russian naval rank of admiral in 1721. He died at Saint Petersburg in 1727.

The historic Kotomin House at Nevsky Prospect, built from 1812 to 1815, was constructed on the site of the former residence of Cornelius Cruys.

References

Footnotes

Bibliography 
 Aase, Roy Lauritz (1997) Admiral Cornelius Cruys: sjøhelten fra Stavanger (Erling Skjalgssonselskapet) 
 Koningsbrugge, Hans van ed. (2009) Life and deeds of Admiral Cornelius Cruys (Groningen: Nederlands-Russisch Archiefcentrum) 
 Titlestad, Torgrim (1999) Tsarens admiral: Cornelius Cruys i Peter den stores tjeneste (Erling Skjalgssonselskapet)

External links 

 

1655 births
1727 deaths
17th-century Dutch military personnel
18th-century Dutch military personnel
Admirals of the navy of the Dutch Republic
Baltic Fleet
Burials at the Oude Kerk, Amsterdam
Dutch people of Norwegian descent
History of Taganrog
Imperial Russian Navy admirals
Norwegian admirals
Norwegian emigrants to the Dutch Republic
Military personnel from Amsterdam
Russian military personnel of the Great Northern War
Russian nobility
Russian people of Norwegian descent
Dutch military personnel of the Nine Years' War